Sotillo is a municipality located in the province of Segovia, which in turn is part of the autonomous community of Castilla y León, Spain.

References

Municipalities in the Province of Segovia